Adhartal is a small town in Jabalpur district, Madhya Pradesh, India. The town is named after King Adhar Singh.

Cities and towns in Jabalpur district